Down the Rabbit Hole is the first book in the Echo Falls mystery series by best selling crime novelist Peter Abrahams. Ingrid is in the wrong place at the wrong time. Or at least her shoes are. And getting them back will mean getting tangled up in a murder investigation as complicated as the mysteries solved by her idol, Sherlock Holmes. With soccer practice, schoolwork, and the lead role in her town's production of Alice in Wonderland, Ingrid is swamped. But as things in Echo Falls keep getting curiouser and curiouser Ingrid realizes she must solve the murder on her own before it's too late!

This book was used in the 2008-2009 Battle Of The Books.

It was the winner (tied) of the 2005 Agatha Award for Best Children/Young Adult Fiction.

References

2005 American novels
American young adult novels
American mystery novels
Agatha Award-winning works
HarperCollins books